Ivan Duranthon (27 February 1897 – 6 March 1978) was a French modern pentathlete. He competed at the 1924 and 1932 Summer Olympics.

References

External links
 

1897 births
1978 deaths
French male modern pentathletes
Olympic modern pentathletes of France
Modern pentathletes at the 1924 Summer Olympics
Modern pentathletes at the 1932 Summer Olympics
People from Algiers
20th-century French people